The 31st Flying Apsaras Awards were held in Ningbo, Zhejiang, China, on April 3, 2018. Nominees and winners are listed below, winners are in bold.

Winners and nominees

References

Flying Apsaras Awards
2018 television awards
2018 in China